Lúthien and Beren are characters in J. R. R. Tolkien's fantasy world Middle-earth. Lúthien is an elf, daughter of the elf-king Thingol and goddess-like Melian. Beren is a mortal man. The complex tale of their love for each other and the quest they are forced to embark upon is a story of triumph against overwhelming odds but ending in tragedy. It appears in The Silmarillion, the epic poem The Lay of Leithian, the Grey Annals section of The War of the Jewels, and in the texts collected in the 2017 book Beren and Lúthien. Their story is told to Frodo by Aragorn in The Lord of the Rings.

The story of Lúthien and Beren, immortal elf-maiden marrying a mortal man and choosing mortality for herself, is mirrored in Tolkien's The Tale of Aragorn and Arwen. The names Beren and Lúthien appear on the grave of Tolkien and his wife Edith.

Context 

Lúthien was a Telerin (Sindarin) princess, the only child of Elu Thingol, king of Doriath, and his queen, Melian the Maia, making her half-royal, half-divine. She was born in the Years of the Trees, according to the Grey Annals. At her birth, the white flower niphredil bloomed for the first time in Doriath.
Lúthien's romance with the mortal man Beren is considered the "chief" of the Silmarillion tales by Tolkien himself; he called it "the kernel of the mythology". Elrond was Lúthien's great-grandson and Aragorn was descended from her via Elros and the Royal Family of Númenor. She is described as the Morning Star of the Elves and as the most beautiful daughter of the one god, Ilúvatar. Beren was the son of Emeldir and Barahir, a man of the royal House of Bëor of Dorthonion.

In contrast, Lúthien's descendant Arwen was called Evenstar, the Evening Star of the Elves, meaning that her beauty reflects that of Lúthien. Lúthien was first cousin once removed of Galadriel, whose mother, Eärwen of Alqualondë, was the daughter of Thingol's brother. The story of Lúthien and Beren is mirrored in The Tale of Aragorn and Arwen.

Etymology 

The name Lúthien appears to mean "daughter of flowers" in a Beleriandic dialect of Sindarin, but it can also be translated "blossom". The epithet Tinúviel was given to her by Beren. It literally means "daughter of the starry twilight", which signifies "nightingale". The name Beren means "brave" in Sindarin.

Fictional biography

Meeting 

Beren saw Lúthien dancing under moonrise in her father's forest, and fell in love with her, captivated by her beauty. He stood in the shadows wishing to be near enough to Lúthien to touch her, but Daeron, her childhood friend and partner in music and dance, noticed Beren and, believing him to be a wild animal, shouted for Lúthien to flee. She saw Beren's shadow and ran away. One day in summer when Lúthien was dancing on a green hill surrounded by hemlocks, she sang, awakening Beren. He ran to her, and again she tried to escape and he cried Tinúviel. When Lúthien gazed upon him she reciprocated his love. He kissed her, but she slipped away and he fell into a deep sleep. In his hour of despair, she appeared before him, and in the Hidden Kingdom of Doriath set her hand in his and cradled his head against her breast. From then on they met secretly.

The quest of the Silmaril 

Daeron, who also loved her, reported her meetings with Beren to her father.
Though Melian warned her husband against it, Thingol was determined not to let Beren marry his daughter, and set a seemingly impossible task as the bride price: Beren had to bring him one of the Silmarils from Morgoth's Iron Crown.

Vision and imprisonment 

Lúthien had a vision of Beren lying suffering in the pits of Morgoth, Lord of Wolves. Her mother told her that Beren was captive in Sauron's dungeons. Lúthien decided to save Beren, asking Daeron for help, but he betrayed her to Thingol. Thingol then had her guarded in the high branches of a beech tree. Daeron was filled with remorse; Lúthien forgave him and devised a plan to escape. She enchanted her hair into a cloak to lull her guards to sleep, and ran from her prison.

On her way to rescue Beren, she found Huan, the Hound of Valinor, and was taken to his master Celegorm. He, plotting to force her to marry him, offered to help her, asking her to follow him to Nargothrond. When she arrived, Celegorm held her hostage and forbade her to talk to anyone else. Huan took pity on her, betraying his master, and freed her. Huan was granted the power to speak, and together they escaped from Nargothrond.

They came to Sauron's Isle, and Lúthien sang a call to Beren. He answered, but Sauron heard her song and sent wolves to slay Huan, but Huan killed them, one by one. Finally, Sauron transformed himself into the most powerful of all werewolves and went out. Huan flinched, but Lúthien smothered Sauron's lunge in her enchanted cloak. Sauron changed into different shapes, but Huan bested him. Lúthien forced Sauron to surrender the keys of his tower; he fled in the shape of a vampire. Lúthien destroyed the Tower. Finding the seemingly-dead Beren, she fell down beside him in grief, but with the rising sun he awoke and they were reunited. Huan returned to Celegorm.

Celegorm, Curufin and the dance of Lúthien before Morgoth 

Beren pleaded with Lúthien to return to her father, but she refused. As they were about to embrace, Celegorm and Curufin appeared, exiled because of Lúthien's escape from Nargothrond. Seeking revenge, they fought Beren, and Huan again fought on Lúthien's side. Beren defeated them, but spared their lives at Lúthien's request. Beren stole one of their horses, and the couple fled. As she slept, he went to Angband to get the Silmaril.

Lúthien and Huan disguised themselves as Morgoth's vampire Thuringwethil and the werewolf Draugluin. She found Beren and they reached the throne of Morgoth, but he saw through Lúthien's disguise. She declared herself and offered to sing for Morgoth. Filled with an evil lust, he accepted, but she put him and his entire court into a deep sleep. She awakened Beren, and he cut a Silmaril from Morgoth's crown. As he tried for another Silmaril, his blade snapped, striking Morgoth's cheek. Lúthien and Beren fled to the gates, where the werewolf Carcharoth attacked them. Beren thrust the Silmaril into its face, but it bit off Beren's hand, swallowing it and the Silmaril. Lúthien sucked out the venom, and with her failing power tried to restore Beren. Huan summoned the Eagles of Manwë, who carried them to Doriath.

Return to Doriath and death of Beren 

Lúthien healed Beren, and together they stood before her father's throne. Beren told Thingol that the quest was fulfilled, and that he held a Silmaril in his hand. When Thingol demanded to see it, Beren showed him his stump. The couple then explained what had happened. They were married before Thingol's throne that day. Meanwhile, Carcharoth slaughtered all the living beings he came across in his frenzied flight, both empowered and tormented by the jewel burning his stomach. Beren, Thingol, Huan, and other Elves went to defeat the beast. Beren was attacked by the wolf; Huan killed the beast, but died of his wounds. Beren was carried to Doriath, where he died in Lúthien's arms.

Lúthien becomes mortal for Beren 

In grief, Lúthien lay down and died, going to the Halls of Mandos. There she sang a song of the suffering of Elves and Men, the greatest ever sung. This proved effective: it was the only time that Mandos ever acted out of pity. He summoned Beren from the houses of the dead, and Lúthien's spirit met his by the shores of the sea. Mandos consulted with Manwë, King of Arda. Even Manwë could not change the fate of Men, and so he gave Lúthien a choice: to live in Valinor, but without Beren; or to return to Middle-earth with Beren as a mortal herself, accepting the Doom of Men. She chose Beren and mortality.

Return to life, and death 

Lúthien and Beren dwelt together in Ossiriand until after the sack of Menegroth. Their abode was Dor Firn-i-Guinar: the "Land of the Dead that Lived". They had a son, Dior.

Thingol received the Nauglamír from Húrin, who had recovered it from the ruins of Nargothrond. Thingol decided to unite the greatest works of the Dwarves and the Elves – the Nauglamír and the Silmaril – and hired Dwarf smiths from Nogrod. The Dwarves murdered Thingol and took the Nauglamír. Beren and an army of Green Elves and Ents waylaid the returning Dwarves. Beren reclaimed the Nauglamír, and Lúthien kept the necklace and the great jewel all her life. This hastened Beren's and Lúthien's end, since her beauty enhanced by the jewel was too bright for mortal lands to bear.

Elrond and Arwen were descendants of Lúthien, as was Aragorn, a descendant of Elrond's brother Elros.

Genealogy

Earlier versions 

In the various versions of The Tale of Tinúviel, Tolkien's earliest form of the tale, as published in The Book of Lost Tales, her original name is Tinúviel. Beren is, in this earlier version, an Elf (specifically a Noldo, or Gnome), and Sauron has not yet emerged. In his place, they face Tevildo, the Prince of Cats, a monstrous cat who is the principal enemy of the Valinorean hound Huan. However Tolkien initially created the character of Beren as a mortal man before this in an even earlier but erased version of the tale.

The story is also told in an epic poem in The Lays of Beleriand, upon which most of the finer details of her life and relationship to Beren is extracted from in this article, since The Silmarillion provides only a generalization of the tale.

Analysis 

In a letter to his son Christopher, dated 11 July 1972, Tolkien requested the inscription below for his wife Edith's grave "for she was (and knew she was) my Lúthien." He added, "I never called Edith Luthien – but she was the source of the story.... It was first conceived in a small woodland glade filled with hemlocks at Roos in Yorkshire where ... she was able to live with me for a while." In a footnote to this letter, Tolkien added "she knew the earliest form of the legend...also the poem eventually printed as Aragorn's song." Particularly affecting for Tolkien was Edith's conversion to the Catholic Church from the Church of England for his sake upon their marriage; this was a difficult decision for her that caused her much hardship, paralleling the difficulties and suffering of Lúthien from choosing mortality.

The Tale of Beren and Lúthien also shares an element with folktales such as the Welsh Culhwch and Olwen and others — namely, the disapproving parent who sets a seemingly impossible task (or tasks) for the suitor, which is then fulfilled.

The Tolkien scholar John Garth, writing in the New Statesman, notes that it took a century for The Tale of Beren and Lúthien, mirroring the tale of Second Lieutenant Tolkien watching Edith dancing in a woodland glade far from the "animal horror" of the trenches, to reach publication. Garth finds "much to relish", as the tale changes through "several gears" until finally it "attains a mythic power". Beren's enemy changes from a cat-demon to the "Necromancer" and eventually to Sauron. Garth comments that if this was supposed to be the lost ancestor of the Rapunzel fairytale, then it definitely portrays a modern "female-centred fairy-tale revisioning" with a Lúthien who may be fairer than mortal tongue can tell, but is also more resourceful than her lover.

The Tolkien grave 

Edith and J. R. R. Tolkien lie in Wolvercote Cemetery in north Oxford.  Their gravestone shows the association of Lúthien with Edith, and Tolkien with Beren. The stone reads:

Notes

References

Primary 
 This list identifies each item's location in Tolkien's writings.

Secondary

Sources

External links 

 

Characters in The Silmarillion
Literary characters introduced in 1977
Fictional amputees
Fictional outlaws
Fictional princesses
Fictional married couples
Grey Elves
Middle-earth Half-elven
Middle-earth Edain
Teleri